"Imitadora" is a song by American singer Romeo Santos. The song was written by Philip (Taj) L. Jackson and Romeo Santos, and conducted by Carlos Dalmasí, with production handled by Vinylz, Romeo Santos, Allen Ritter and Frank Dukes. It was released to digital retailers on June 23, 2017, through Sony Music Latin, as the second single released off Santos' third studio album, Golden.

Music video
The music video was released on July 18, 2017, on YouTube through Vevo. It features Colombian TV host Jessica Cediel. The video shows Santos interrogating a woman (Cediel) because she is not who he thinks she is, and wants her to prove that she is the same person he used to know. The video also shows scenes of Santos and Cediel making love in his bedroom and the bathroom.

Critical reception
Leila Cobo of Billboard wrote: "'Imitadora' is vintage Romeo in its sensual/sexual intricate lyrics, its storytelling and sense of drama wrapped with a great chorus." They regarded the song as "a man's desperate plea to the woman who once loved him and who now has changed beyond recognition." Shirley Gomez of Latin Times called the song "a bachata in Santos' unique style, a fusion of rhythms that makes the singer-songwriter's signature bachata sound." Isabelia Herrera de Remezcla wrote that the song is "a strong comeback for Romeo, a more potent follow-up to the jazzy bachata serenade 'Héroe Favorito'"

Credits and personnel
Credits adapted from Tidal.

 Romeo Santos – composer, lyricist, producer, executive producer, arranger
 Philip (Taj) L. Jackson – composer, background vocalist
 Carlos Dalmasí – conductor
 Allen Ritter – producer, pianist, synthesizer
 Frank Dukes – producer
 Vinylz – producer
 Iván Chévere a/k/a Matetraxx – mixing engineer, engineer
 Tom Brick – mastering engineer
 Alexander "ChiChi" Caba – acoustic guitarist, guitarist
 Adam "Pikachu" Gómez – bassist
 Raúl Bier – Bongo player
 Joaquín Díaz – pianist, synthesizer, arranger
 Mario Hugo – art director

Charts

Certifications

See also
List of Billboard number-one Latin songs of 2017

References

2017 singles
2017 songs
Songs written by Romeo Santos
Spanish-language songs
Sony Music Latin singles
Romeo Santos songs